Emarginula striatula is a species of slit limpet, a marine gastropod mollusc in the family Fissurellidae, the keyhole limpets and slit limpets.

Distribution
This marine species is found only in the vicinity of New Zealand and surrounding islands.

References

 Finlay, H. J. (1928). The Recent Mollusca of the Chatham Islands. Transactions of the New Zealand Institute. 59: 232-286.
 Beu, A.G. (1967) Deep-water Pliocene Mollusca from Palliser Bay, New Zealand. Transactions of the Royal Society of New Zealand, Geology, 5, 89–122.
 Spencer, H.G., Marshall, B.A. & Willan, R.C. (2009). Checklist of New Zealand living Mollusca. Pp 196-219. in: Gordon, D.P. (ed.) New Zealand inventory of biodiversity. Volume one. Kingdom Animalia: Radiata, Lophotrochozoa, Deuterostomia. Canterbury University Press, Christchurch.
 Maxwell, P.A. (2009). Cenozoic Mollusca. Pp 232-254 in Gordon, D.P. (ed.) New Zealand inventory of biodiversity. Volume one. Kingdom Animalia: Radiata, Lophotrochozoa, Deuterostomia. Canterbury University Press, Christchurch

External links
 Quoy J.R.C. & Gaimard J.P. (1832-1835). Voyage de découvertes de l'"Astrolabe" exécuté par ordre du Roi, pendant les années 1826-1829, sous le commandement de M. J. Dumont d'Urville. Zoologie. 1: i-l, 1-264; 2(1): 1-321 [1832; 2(2): 321-686 [1833]; 3(1): 1-366 [1834]; 3(2): 367-954 [1835]; Atlas (Mollusques): pls 1-93]

Fissurellidae
Gastropods of New Zealand
Gastropods described in 1834